Honey Bunches of Oats is a breakfast cereal owned by Post Holdings and produced by its subsidiary Post Consumer Brands. Created by lifelong Post employee Vernon J. Herzing by mixing several of Post's cereals together and having his daughter taste them, Honey Bunches of Oats was introduced to markets in 1989 after three years of development. The cereal is made up of three kinds of flakes and oat clusters baked with a hint of honey. It is marketed as a source of whole grain. Other varieties have almonds or fruits added into the mix.

Ingredients
The ingredients of the cereal are corn, whole grain wheat, sugar, whole grain rolled oats, brown sugar, vegetable oil (canola or sunflower oil), rice flour, wheat flour, malted barley flour, salt, rice, whey (from milk), honey, malted corn and barley syrup, annatto extract (color).

Varieties
The following are current, past, and limited editions:

Vitamins and minerals
Honey Bunches of Oats contains iron, niacinamide, vitamin B6, vitamin A palmitate, riboflavin (vitamin B2), thiamine mononitrate (vitamin B1), zinc oxide (source of zinc), folic acid, vitamin B12, vitamin D.

Slogans 

"Good things come in bunches." (slogan at launch)
"It's what's for breakfast."
"That's why they call it 'The Best of the Bunch'."
"One spoonful is all it takes." (2007–2009)
"Taste the joy in every spoonful." (2009–present)
"The magic's in the mix."

References

External links
 
 Nutrition Facts

Post cereals
Products introduced in 1989
Post Consumer Brands brands